Bondi Beach—also known as Unfinished Beach Polyptych—is a 1992 painting by Australian artist Brett Whiteley. The painting is a six-panel work depicting the eponymous Bondi Beach in Sydney. The work was unfinished at the time of his death in 1992.

The work appeared in an exhibition at Hazelhurst Regional Gallery and Arts Centre in 2012: Brett Whiteley: On The Water

The painting was purchased in a private sale from Whiteley's estate in 2015 by a private collector who hangs the work in his private residence. The purchaser did not disclose the price but claimed it was greater than any known price for an Australian painting at the time.

References

Paintings by Brett Whiteley
1992 paintings
Paintings in Australia
Unfinished paintings